The 1998 Hertsmere Borough Council election took place on 7 May 1998 to elect members of Hertsmere District Council in Hertfordshire, England. One third of the council was up for election and the Labour party stayed in overall control of the council.

After the election, the composition of the council was
Labour 22
Conservative 11
Liberal Democrat 6

Election result

References

1998 English local elections
1998
1990s in Hertfordshire